Baron Charles Cagniard de la Tour (31 March 1777 – 5 July 1859) was a French engineer and physicist. Charles Cagniard was born in Paris, and after attending the École Polytechnique became one of the ingénieurs géographiques. He examined the mechanism of voice-production, invented a blowing machine and contributed to acoustics by inventing an improved siren. He also studied yeast.

In 1822, he discovered the critical point of a substance in his gun barrel experiments. Listening to discontinuities in the sound of a rolling flint ball in a sealed gun barrel filled with fluids at various temperatures, he observed the critical temperature. Above this temperature, the densities of the liquid and gas phases become equal and the distinction between them disappears, resulting in a single supercritical fluid phase.

He was made a baron in 1818, and died in Paris. Despite several claims to the contrary, no portraits of Baron Cagniard de la Tour exist.

Research 

He was the author of numerous inventions, including the cagniardelle, a blowing machine, which consists essentially of an Archimedean screw set obliquely in a tank of water in such a way that its lower end is completely and its upper end partially immersed, and operated by being rotated in the opposite direction to that required for raising water.

He invented the improved siren, which was named after him, around 1819 and he used it for ascertaining the number of vibrations corresponding to a sound of any particular pitch. He also made experiments on the mechanism of voice-production.

In course of an investigation in 1822–1823 on the effects of heat and pressure on certain liquids he found that for each there was a certain temperature above which it refused to remain liquid but passed into the gaseous state, no matter what the amount of pressure to which it was subjected, and in the case of water he determined this critical temperature, with a remarkable approach to accuracy, to be 362 °C. He also studied the nature of yeast and the influence of extreme cold upon its life.

Notes

References
Attribution:

Further reading
B. Berche, M. Henkel and R. Kenna, "Critical Phenomena: 150 Years since Cagniard de la Tour", Journal of Physical Studies 13 (2009) 3201 (http://de.arxiv.org/abs/0905.1886)

1777 births
1859 deaths
French physicists
Members of the French Academy of Sciences